Maria Dolors Mestre i Pal (1929 – 15 November 2010), was an Andorran philanthropist, born in La Seu d'Urgell (Catalonia, Spain), known in Andorra and Alt Urgell for the charities she made throughout her life.

Maria Maestre was the daughter of Dr. Xavier Maestre and Maria Pal, the daughter of the owners of the Baths of San Vicente, and granddaughter of former Parliament Speaker Bonaventura Master Moles. She was the matriarch of wealthy the Andorran family Casa Molines, owners of which is currently called Molines Patrimonis, a heritage asset management company in Andorra.

In 2006, she received the City Medal of the City Council of La Seu d'Urgell for the creation of the "Francesc Xavier" kindergarten and the center for psychic disabled Taller Claror. In her testament she designated the Bishopric of Urgell as sole heirs of her patrimony.

References

1929 births
2010 deaths
People from La Seu d'Urgell
Andorran philanthropists
20th-century philanthropists
20th-century women philanthropists